Alexander Schmidt may refer to:

 Alexander Schmidt (physiologist) (1831–1894), Livonian physiologist
 Alexander Schmidt (politician) (1879–1937), Moldavian politician
 Alexander Schmidt (mathematician) (born 1965), German mathematician
 Alexander Schmidt (football manager) (born 1968), German football manager
 Alexander Schmidt (footballer) (born 1998), Austrian football player
 Alexander M. Schmidt (1930–1991), American physician